Lora B. Pearson School, also known as Colescott School and School No. 4, is a historic school building located at Shelbyville, Shelby County, Indiana. It was built in 1939, and is a three-story, rectangular, Art Deco style reinforced concrete building faced in brick and limestone.  Funding for the school was provided in part by the Public Works Administration.  The school closed in 2000 and was converted to senior apartments.

It was listed on the National Register of Historic Places in 2009.

References

Public Works Administration in Indiana
School buildings on the National Register of Historic Places in Indiana
Art Deco architecture in Indiana
School buildings completed in 1939
Schools in Shelby County, Indiana
National Register of Historic Places in Shelby County, Indiana